Portobello is a village beside the Otago Harbour halfway along the Otago Peninsula in Dunedin City, New Zealand. It lies at the foot of a small peninsula (Portobello Peninsula) between Portobello Bay and Latham Bay.

Like scores of Dunedin features, Portobello was named after a locality in Edinburgh, Scotland, also called Portobello.

At the end of Portobello Peninsula sits a marine research station, the Portobello Marine Laboratory, which is part of the University of Otago. Close to the end of this peninsula lies Quarantine Island / Kamau Taurua.

Portobello features a Historical Society Museum, the 1908 Restaurant, a local primary school (Portobello School, Years 1-8), the old Portobello Hotel (a pub), a cafe and several accommodation providers, including a camping ground, bed and breakfasts and motels. A local dairy acts as the community's grocers, though most of the village's retail needs are served by Dunedin, which is easily accessed via the winding but well-surfaced Portobello Road which runs along the edge of the harbour. A multi-year project to raise and widen this road and add a 19km shared-use pathway is nearing completion, safely connecting Portobello to Dunedin for cyclists and walkers. This pathway is part of the larger Otago Harbour Cycleway. A more convoluted but scenic route, Highcliff Road, connects Portobello with Dunedin city centre via the ridge of the peninsula.

Boating is an historical focus for Portobello. In the past, Portobello residents caught the ferry to the city, before the Portobello Road along the foreshore was constructed. Today, scheduled ferry service to Kamau Taurua and Port Chalmers departs from the recently renovated ferry jetty, a short distance from the centre of the village. A boating club maintains a slipway and boat shed near the jetty.

Portobello Community Inc. is the local community group, which works to improve Portobello for its community.

Demographics

Portobello had a population of 594 at the 2018 New Zealand census, an increase of 72 people (13.8%) since the 2013 census, and an increase of 93 people (18.6%) since the 2006 census. There were 237 households. There were 300 males and 291 females, giving a sex ratio of 1.03 males per female, with 111 people (18.7%) aged under 15 years, 57 (9.6%) aged 15 to 29, 306 (51.5%) aged 30 to 64, and 117 (19.7%) aged 65 or older.

Ethnicities were 94.4% European/Pākehā, 11.6% Māori, 2.5% Pacific peoples, 1.5% Asian, and 2.0% other ethnicities (totals add to more than 100% since people could identify with multiple ethnicities).

Although some people objected to giving their religion, 66.7% had no religion, 23.2% were Christian and 3.5% had other religions.

Of those at least 15 years old, 171 (35.4%) people had a bachelor or higher degree, and 57 (11.8%) people had no formal qualifications. The employment status of those at least 15 was that 243 (50.3%) people were employed full-time, 84 (17.4%) were part-time, and 12 (2.5%) were unemployed.

Education
Portobello School is a state co-educational primary school for year 1 to 8 children, with a roll of  students as of  The school opened in 1857.

References

Further reading

External links

Populated places in Otago
Otago Peninsula
Suburbs of Dunedin